Meruacesa is a genus in the family Eulophidae. It was formerly known as Meruana but this is now considered a junior homonym, due to the name being preoccupied by an East African genus of grasshoppers in the family Acrididae.

References

External links
Key to Nearctic eulophid genera
Universal Chalcidoidea Database

Eulophidae